Yanhu Township is a township in the east of Gê'gyai County, western Tibet Autonomous Region, People's Republic of China.

See also
List of towns and villages in Tibet

Populated places in Tibet
Township-level divisions of Tibet